Juan Millán Rubio (born 22 January 1994) is a Spanish retired footballer who played as a forward.

Club career
Born in Barcelona, Catalonia, after a brief period with CA Roda de Barà, Millán joined Gimnàstic de Tarragona's youth ranks. In March 2012, he and Eugeni were called up to train with the first team.

Millán made his first team debut on 17 March 2012, starting in a 3–1 away win against FC Cartagena in the Segunda División. In the 2013 summer, Millán returned to Roda de Barà, playing for the side in the Segona Catalana.

References

External links
 
 Gimnàstic profile 

1994 births
Living people
Footballers from Barcelona
Spanish footballers
Association football forwards
Segunda División players
Divisiones Regionales de Fútbol players
Gimnàstic de Tarragona footballers